George MacDonald (1824–1905) was a Scottish author, poet, and Christian minister.

George MacDonald or McDonald may also refer to:

Politicians
 George William McDonald (1875–1950), politician in Manitoba, Canada
 George McDonald (Australian politician) (1883–1951), New South Wales state MP
 George MacDonald (British Columbia politician), former mayor of Penticton, British Columbia; see List of mayors of Penticton
 George MacDonald (Prince Edward Island politician), former mayor of Charlottetown, Prince Edward Island

Sportspeople
 George MacDonald (rower) (1906–1997), Canadian rower and Olympic medalist
 George McDonald (American football) (born 1976), American football coach
 George McDonald (rugby league), New Zealand international
 George McDonald (Australian footballer) (1893–1968), Australian rules footballer

Others
 George Browne MacDonald (1805–1868), father of the MacDonald sisters
 George E. MacDonald (1857–1944), an early 20th-century editor of the Freethought paper Truth Seeker
 George Macdonald (archaeologist) (1862–1940), Scottish archaeologist
 George Macdonald (historian) (1891–1967), New Zealand farmer and historian
 George James MacDonald (Commissioner of Crown Lands) (1805−1851), Commissioner of Crown Lands in New South Wales
 George James Macdonald (1921–1982), New Zealand naval officer, civil engineer and inventor
 George F. MacDonald (1938–2020), Canadian anthropologist and museum director
 George Macdonald (Canadian general) (born c. 1950), Vice Chief of the Defence Staff of the Canadian Forces
 George MacDonald (game designer), founder of Hero Games
 George T. McDonald (1944–2021), founder of the Doe Fund for the American homeless
 George E. McDonald (union leader) (1923–2014), union leader in New York City
 George E. McDonald (architect), American architect
 George Macdonald (malariologist), British Scientist

See also
 George MacDonald Fraser (1925–2008), author of the Flashman series